Litargus balteatus, the stored grain fungus beetle, is a species of hairy fungus beetle in the family Mycetophagidae. It is found in North America, Oceania, Europe, and temperate Asia.

References

Further reading

External links

 

Tenebrionoidea
Articles created by Qbugbot
Beetles described in 1856